Hibbertia cinerea is a species of flowering plant in the family Dilleniaceae and is endemic to the southern part of the Eyre Peninsula in South Australia. It is a densely-branched, hairy shrub with narrow elliptic to lance-shaped leaves, and yellow flowers arranged on the ends of branchlet, with nine to twelve stamens arranged in a group on one side of the two carpels.

Description
There are nine to twelve stamens arranged in one group alongside the two carpels, each carpel with two ovules. Flowering occurs from August to December.

Taxonomy
This species was first formally described in 1817 by Augustin Pyramus de Candolle in the his book Regni Vegetabilis Systema Naturale and was given the name Pleurandra cinerea from an unpublished description by Robert Brown. In 1998, Hellmut R. Toelken changed the name to Hibbertia cinerea in the Journal of the Adelaide Botanic Gardens. The specific epithet (cinerea) means "ash-covered" or "grey".

Distribution and habitat
This hibbertia grows in sandy soil in coastal scrub or low mallee vegetation on the southern tip of the Eyre Peninsula in South Australia.

See also
List of Hibbertia species

References

cinerea
Flora of South Australia
Plants described in 1817
Taxa named by Augustin Pyramus de Candolle